The Rajyotsava Prashasti or  Rajyotsava Awards, the second highest civilian honor of the Karnataka state of India are conferred annually by the Karnataka Government on the occasion of the establishment of the state on 1 November celebrated as the Kannada Rajyotsava.

The awards are presented in Bengaluru by the Chief Minister of Karnataka on 1 November of every year. Each award carries an amount of 100,000, a 20-gram gold medal and a citation. In addition to that, the government has in the past, allotted commercial land for eligible awardees.

History
Karnataka Rajyotsava Award was instituted in 1966 to be awarded to citizens of Karnataka in recognition of their distinguished contribution in various spheres of activity including the Arts, Education, Industry, Literature, Science, Sports, Medicine, Social Service and Public Affairs. It has also been awarded to some distinguished individuals who were not citizens of Karnataka but did contribute in various ways to Karnataka. The award was not conferred in 1977, 1978, 1979, 1980 and 2009.

Award winners

2022 awards

The Government of Karnataka announced 67 names for the year 2022 on the occasion of the 67th anniversary of the awards.

The awardees for 2022 include former ISRO Chairman K. Sivan, writers A.R. Mitra and Krishne Gowda, Kannada actors Wing Commander H.G. Dattatreya (retd.), Avinash and Sihi Kahi Chandru.

On the occasion of the seventy fifth anniversary of Indian independence, 10 organisations, including Sri Ramakrishna Ashrama, Mysuru, Nele Foundation (for rehabilitating orphans), Amrutha Sishu Nivas have been selected for the award.

2019 awards

The Government of Karnataka announced 64 names for the year 2019 on the occasion of the 64th anniversary of the awards. The awards were given away at Ravindra Kalakshetra in Bengaluru on 1 November 2019 by Chief Minister B. S. Yeddyurappa.

The awardees for 2019 include K. Chidananda Gowda (former Vice Chancellor, Kuvempu University), V. A. Deshpande (sculptor), Mohan H Sitnoor (artist), Chandrakanth Karadalli (Children's writer), H. Kushi (young Yoga exponent), Muddu Mohan (Hindustani musician), among others.

2018 awards
The Government of Karnataka announced 63 names for the year 2018 on the occasion of the 63rd anniversary of the awards. The awards were given away at the Vidhana Soudha on 29 November 2018 by Chief Minister HD Kumaraswamy.

Nitin Hiremath From Hubli(Laxmivana), Sarvamangala, Bhargava From Mysuru, Kere Kaamegowda From Mandya Among Rajyotsava Awardees. Rajyotsava Awardees includes former Union Minister Margaret Alva, former Chief Justice of India H. L. Dattu, former Olympics sprinter Kenneth Lawrence Powell, Sandalwood actor Jai Jagadish and National Public School founder KP Gopalkrishna are among the other winners.

2016 awards

The Government of Karnataka announced 61 names for the year 2016 on the occasion of the 61st anniversary of the awards.

2015 awards
Hanumanth Hugar

The Government of Karnataka announced 60 names for the year 2015 on the occasion of the 60th anniversary of the awards.

2014 awards

The Government of Karnataka announced 59 names for the year 2014 on the occasion of the 59th anniversary of the awards.  The awards were given away at the Ravindra Kalakshetra in Bangalore on 1 November 2014.  The 2014 awards saw 1924 nominations that were screened by a panel. Karnataka Chief Minister Siddaramiah announced that the government would bring out commemorative postal stamps of the 59 awardees.

The award winners for 2014 include S. Janaki (playback singer), Justice M N Venkatachalaih (former Chief Justice of India), Dr. K. Kasturirangan (former ISRO head), Dr. B.N. Suresh (ISRO scientist), M. R. Poovamma (athlete), Mamatha Poojari (kabaddi player),  M. S. Rajashekar (Kannada movie director), Vaijanath Biradar Patil (veteran Kannada actor), D Kumardas (Hindustani vocal singer), amongst others.

2013 awards

2012 awards

2011 awards

2010 awards

2008 awards

2007 awards

2006 awards

2005 awards

2004 awards

2003 awards

Azim Premji, Rahul Dravid, 
Sree Ramaseva Mandali (organization), Rathnamma Hegde were some of the prominent awardees.
Gurumurthy Reddy who was CMC president bommanahalli was also awarded for his social contribution towards society.

1999 awards
Among others, K. S. Bhagawan was honoured for his contributions to the field of literature.

D. M. Shambu was honoured for his contributions to the field of Sculpting

1998 awards
Shesha Jayaram (Professor of Electrical and Computer Engineering & Director of HVEL, University of Waterloo, Canada). She was given the award for her contribution to science, electrical and high voltage engineering, and academia.

1996 awards
Among others, C. P. Krishnakumar was given the award for his contribution to literature. Bharatanatyam exponent and dance teacher S. Narmada was awarded for Indian classical dance.

List of awardees for prior years

 List of Rajyotsava award recipients (1966–1970)
 List of Rajyotsava award recipients (1971–1976)
 List of Rajyotsava award recipients (1981–1990)
 List of Rajyotsava award recipients (1991–2000)

External links
List of Rajyotsava Awardees at the Official website of Govt of Karnataka.

References

Civil awards and decorations of Karnataka

Awards established in 1966
1966 establishments in Mysore State